Bandidas is a 2006 Western action comedy film starring Salma Hayek and Penélope Cruz directed by Norwegian directors Joachim Rønning and Espen Sandberg and produced and written by Luc Besson. It tells the tale of two very different women in late-19th-century Mexico who become a bank robbing duo in an effort to combat a ruthless enforcer terrorizing their town.

This is the first film that Cruz and Hayek starred in together. It was a co-production among France, the United States and Mexico. Filming took place in Sierra de Órganos National Park in the town of Sombrerete, Mexico, as well as in the Mexican states of Durango and San Luis Potosí.

Plot
In 1890s Mexico, María Álvarez (Penélope Cruz) is an uneducated, poor farm-girl whose caring father is being forced off his land by a cruel U.S. land baron named Tyler Jackson (Dwight Yoakam). Sara Sandoval (Salma Hayek) is the highly educated, wealthy daughter of the arrogant owner of the nearby properties, and has recently returned from Europe where she attended numerous grade schools and colleges in England, Spain, and France for several years. In one fell swoop, both María's and Sara's fathers fall under attack by the baron (Sara's father is killed, María's is shot but survives), giving him free rein in the nearby territories. As an act of revenge, María and Sara team up to become bank robbers, stealing and giving back to the poor Mexicans who have lost their lands.

At first, the pair's relationship is characterized by petty cattiness stemming in part from their different backgrounds, but under the tutelage of famed bank robber Bill Buck (Sam Shepard) they learn to trust each other. During their crucial training session at the edge of a cliff, the two women test their strength by hanging from a metal bar over a wide river. At the point of exhaustion María tells Sara she cannot swim before losing her grip on the bar. Sara voluntarily drops into the river and saves her. The two women put aside their differences and agree that, while they are not friends yet, they can at least work together as partners. María turns out to be a crack shot and, while Sara can barely hold a gun, she shows that she is an expert with throwing knives.

Angered by the recent attacks by two women, who are now known by the public as the "Bandidas", Jackson brings in a specialist criminal investigator named Quentin Cooke (Steve Zahn). When Sara and María learn this, they capture Cooke and seduce him to help them. He has already figured out that Sara's father was murdered and therefore discovers that his client is a criminal.

The trio embark upon bigger, more ambitious heists, during which María and Sara compete for Quentin's affections. In a move to make the money they have stolen useless, Jackson moves the gold that backs the money on a train up towards U.S. territories. Midway, he decides to steal the gold, betraying the Mexican government. The Bandidas hunt him down, but when they get their chance to kill him, they decline to do so, feeling it would make them no better than him. Jackson manages to draw his gun and almost gets a shot off at María but Sara shoots first, killing him. Quentin meets with his fiancée, much to María's heartbreak. She and Sara ride off into the sunset, their eyes set on Europe, where Sara says the banks are bigger.

Cast
 Salma Hayek as Sara Sandoval
 Penélope Cruz as María Álvarez 
 Steve Zahn as Quentin Cooke 
 Dwight Yoakam as Tyler Jackson
 Denis Arndt as Ashe
 Jose Maria Negri as Padre Pablo
 Audra Blaser as Clarissa Ashe
 Sam Shepard as Bill Buck  
 Ismael 'East' Carlo as Don Diego Sandoval
 Edgar Vivar as The Bank Manager

Release and reception
Bandidas earned $18,381,890 worldwide including $3,153,999 in Mexico and $2,380,000 in Russia. The film earned mixed to positive reviews, with a 57% out of 14 reviews on Rotten Tomatoes.

See also
 Viva Maria!

References

External links
 
 
 
 OhmyNews Film Review

2006 films
2006 action comedy films
2000s buddy comedy films
2000s female buddy films
2000s Western (genre) comedy films
20th Century Fox films
American action comedy films
American buddy comedy films
American female buddy films
American films about revenge
American Western (genre) comedy films
English-language French films
English-language Mexican films
EuropaCorp films
Films about bank robbery
Films directed by Joachim Rønning
Films directed by Espen Sandberg
Films produced by Luc Besson
Films scored by Éric Serra
Films set in the 1850s
Films set in Mexico
Films shot in Mexico
Films with screenplays by Luc Besson
Films with screenplays by Robert Mark Kamen
French action comedy films
French female buddy films
French films about revenge
French Western (genre) comedy films
Girls with guns films
Mexican action comedy films
Films about Mexican Americans
Mexican Western (genre) comedy films
Hispanic and Latino American action films
Hispanic and Latino American comedy films
Spanish-language American films
2006 directorial debut films
2006 comedy films
2000s American films
2000s French films
2000s Mexican films